Saint-Ignace is a settlement in Kent County, New Brunswick, Canada on the Kouchibouguacis River. It is part of the Local Service District of Saint-Ignace, which also includes the community of Camerons Mill.

Geography

Geology
The basement of St. Ignatius is composed mainly of sedimentary rock group dating from the Pictou Pennsylvanian (300 to 311 million years ago)

History

Notable people

Mia Martina, singer

See also
List of communities in New Brunswick

References

Communities in Kent County, New Brunswick
Designated places in New Brunswick
Local service districts of Kent County, New Brunswick